A focal point review (FPR) is a human resources process for employee evaluation.

References

Human resource management